The Ethnological Museum of Berlin is one of the Berlin State Museums, the de facto national collection of the Federal Republic of Germany. It is presently located in the Humboldt Forum in Mitte, along with the Museum of Asian Art. The museum holds more than 500,000 objects and is one of the largest and most important collections of works of art and culture from outside Europe in the world. Its highlights include important objects from the Sepik River, Hawaii, the Kingdom of Benin, Cameroon, Congo, Tanzania, China, the Pacific Coast of North America, Mesoamerica, the Andes, as well as one of the first ethnomusicology collections of sound recordings (the Berliner Phonogramm-Archiv).

The Ethnological Museum was founded in 1873 and opened its doors in 1886 as the Royal Museum for Ethnology, but its roots go back to the 17th-century Kunstkammer of the rulers of Brandenburg-Prussia.  As the museum’s collections expanded in the early 20th century, the museum quickly outgrew its facility in the center of Berlin on Königgrätzer Straße (today named Stresemannstraße). A new building was erected in Dahlem to house the museum’s store rooms and study collections. In the Second World War, the main building of the museum was heavily damaged. It was demolished in 1961, and the buildings in Dahlem (in what was then West Berlin) were reconfigured to serve as the museum's exhibition spaces. 
 
Following German reunification, although many of the Berlin museum collections were relocated, the collections of the Ethnological Museum remained in Dahlem. Starting in 2000, concrete plans were developed to relocate the collections back to the center of the city. In 2021, the Ethnological Museum and Museum of Asian Art were reopened in the Humboldt Forum in the reconstructed Berlin City Palace immediately south of the main Museum Island complex.

Collections
Beginning in January 2016, the Ethnological Museum began the process of dismantling its exhibitions in preparation for its move to the Humboldt Forum.  Until January 2017, the museum will remain open to the public, and its permanent exhibitions of works from Africa, Mesoamerican archaeology, and South Asia can still be viewed.  Highlights include the collections of painted Maya vases and drinking cups, Benin bronzes, sculpture from Cameroon, and power figures from Congo.

The collections themselves encompass more than 500,000 from around the world. In addition, the museum holds more than 280,000 historical photographs, a substantial archive, more than 125,000 sound recordings, and 20,000 ethnographic films. The collection is organized according to geography as well as methodological approaches. The main divisions are Africa, Oceania, East-and North-Asia, South and Southeast Asia, the Middle East and Central Asia, American ethnology, American archaeology, and ethnomusicology.  The museum also houses a specialized reference library of more than 140,000 volumes relating to ethnology, non-European art, and global art.

These collections are all housed in the museum complex in Dahlem. Long-term plans are being made to relocate the collections not on display to Friedrichshagen, an eastern suburb of Berlin, where the Prussian Cultural Heritage Foundation has already constructed storage facilities for the Berlin State Library.

Repatriation of stolen artifacts 
In 2021, the museum announced plans to return some of its holding of Nigerian artifacts, including a large collection of Benin Bronzes, to Nigeria. The Bronzes had been looted during the British Benin Expedition of 1897.

In 2022, a group of 23 artifacts from the collection, including precious jewelry and pottery, was returned indefinitely to Namibia. The items were taken between 1884 and 1915, when Namibia was part of the German Empire colony German South West Africa.

Selected works

Architecture 

The museum's first building in the center of Berlin on Königgrätzer Straße (now Stresemannstraße at the corner with Niederkirchnerstraße) was already too small to accommodate the collections when it opened in 1886. The situation deteriorated further in the last years of the 19th century, as the collections expanded rapidly because of increased institutional support for ethnology and the growth of the German overseas colonial empire after the Berlin Conference.

By 1906, the first construction began on a second facility for the museum in Dahlem. The museum intended to use space in Dahlem to store and conduct research on the large collections, but to continue to exhibit portions of the collection in the building in the city center. Plans were developed for a large complex in Dahlem, consisting of four large buildings, one for each of the non-European geographical regions of the globe: Asia, Africa, Oceania, and the Americas, the latter department directed by Konrad Theodor Preuss. Construction began in 1914, the architect Bruno Paul was commissioned to build the structure to house the Asian collections on Arnimallee, Dahlem. The work was stopped, however, because of the First World War and was only completed in 1921. However, the museum lacked the resources to erect the other three planned buildings. The museum continued to function with two separate facilities housing its collections until the Second World War.

Following the Second World War, as a result of the division of Berlin, the Prussian Cultural Heritage Foundation decided to house the portions of the Gemäldegalerie (Picture Gallery) that were returned to West Berlin in the Bruno Paul building. This decision required moving the collections of the Ethnological Museum to a new facility. The architect Fritz Bornemann developed plans for an extension to the Bruno Paul building, which was erected from 1966 to 1970. The Bornemann building faced onto Lansstraße with an uncompromisingly modernist pavilion and contrasted sharply with the older neo-classical Bruno Paul structure, with its main entrance on Arnimallee.

References 
 Peter Bolz: Die Berliner Nordamerika-Sammlung des Prinzen Maximilian zu Wied. S. 88–91 in: Nordamerika Native Museum, Zürich (Karin Isernhagen): Karl Bodmer. A Swiss Artist in America 1809–1893. Ein Schweizer Künstler in Amerika. Scheidegger & Spiess, Zürich, 2009. .
 Michael Falser: Gipsabgüsse von Angkor Wat für das Völkerkundemuseum in Berlin – eine sammlungsgeschichtliche Anekdote. In: Indo-Asiatische Zeitschrift, Mitteilungen der Gesellschaft für Indo-Asiatische Kunst Berlin 16/2012, S. 43–58.
 Viola König (ed.): Ethnologisches Museum Berlin. Prestel, München u. a. 2003, .
 Markus Schindlbeck (ed.): Expeditionen in die Südsee. Begleitbuch zur Ausstellung und Geschichte der Südsee-Sammlung des Ethnologischen Museums. Reimer, Berlin, 2007, .
 Sigrid Westphal-Hellbusch:. "Zur Geschichte des Museums." In: "Hundert Jahre Museum für Völkerkunde Berlin," special issue, Baessler-Archiv: Beiträge zur Völkerkunde, n.s., 21 (1973): 1–99.

Directors 
 Adolf Bastian (1873–1904)
 Felix von Luschan (1904–1910)
 Otto Kümmel (1923-1934)
 Hans-Dietrich Disselhoff (1954–1970)
 Kurt Krieger (1970–1985)
 Klaus Helfrich (1985–2001)
 Viola König (2001–2017)
 Lars-Christian Koch (since 2017)

Footnotes

External links

Museum website 
Location map of National Museums in Berlin
Flickr 205 images
Outlining the Kümmel Report: Between German Nationality and Aesthetics

Museums in Berlin
Ethnographic museums in Germany
Buildings and structures in Mitte
Art museums and galleries in Berlin
African art museums
Mesoamerican art museums
Berlin State Museums
Museums established in 1873